Talthybia is a genus of Asian orb-weaver spiders containing the single species, Talthybia depressa. It was first described by Tamerlan Thorell in 1898, and has only been found in China and Myanmar.

References

Araneidae
Monotypic Araneomorphae genera
Spiders of Asia
Taxa named by Tamerlan Thorell